Better Made Potato Chips Inc. is a brand name for a variety of potato chips in the United States that was founded in 1930. Better Made is also the name of the company that produces the potato chips. The company provides consumers with a wide variety of potato chips, pork rinds, cheese curls, and cheese puffs.

History
In 1930, Cross Moceri and Peter Cipriano purchased a potato chip factory in Detroit, Michigan. The building is located on the east side of Detroit on Gratiot Avenue near Belle Isle, Downtown Detroit, and Eastern Market. In 1934, the company was known as Cross & Peters Company. That same year, Peter and Cross launched their first and only brand of potato chips: Better Made.

At the time, there were 31 potato chip companies in the City of Detroit.

In 1937, workers at the company unionized and pay increased to 40 cents per hour. With sales up, the company moved to its current location on Gratiot Avenue on the east side of Detroit in 1955. New and improved fryers cooked up to 100 pounds of potato chips at a time. In 1955, wavy and rigid potato chips were introduced, and in the 1960s, Popcorn, Barbecue, Red Hot, and Cheese flavors. By the 1970s, Better Made expanded sales to Toledo, Ohio. Peter Cipriano died in 1981. Three months later, Cross Moceri died as well. Ownership was inherited and split equally between the sons of the two men. Robert Marriacino was hired as president of the company with all children of the two men holding high ranking positions within the company.

In 1990, the 60th anniversary of Cross & Peters Company was celebrated with special edition bags of chips and new special edition flavors such as ketchup. In 2003, the Moceri family's ownership interests in the company were bought out. The company rebranded as Better Made Snack Foods Inc. That same year, the company sold 36 million dollars of products.  In 2008, the company made their products available for online purchase.

In 1994, the company merged with a potato chip firm, Made-Rite Chip Company, in Bay City, Michigan.

In 2015, Arcadia published the book "Better Made in Michigan - The Salty Story of Detroit's Best Chip" by Karen Dybis.

In popular culture
The company was featured in the series finale of Detroiters, including interior shots in the factory.

References

External links
 Better Made Home Page

Brand name snack foods
Brand name potato chips and crisps
Snack food manufacturers of the United States
Manufacturing companies based in Detroit
American companies established in 1930
Food and drink companies established in 1930
1930 establishments in Michigan
Culture of Detroit